Dismorphia altis is a butterfly in the  family Pieridae. It is found in Colombia.

Adults have white undersides that are mottled in grey and yellow.

References

Dismorphiinae
Butterflies described in 1910